Marybeth Linzmeier Dorst (born July 24, 1963), née Marybeth Linzmeier, is an American former competition swimmer who represented the United States at the Pan American Games and World University Games in the early 1980s.

Early life
Linzmeier was a star swimmer at Mission Viejo High School in Mission Viejo, California and qualified for the 1980 Summer Olympics in Moscow in several swimming events.  Due to the United States-led boycott of the Moscow Olympics in protest of the Soviet invasion of Afghanistan, however, she did not participate in the Olympics.

Collegiate career
Linzmeier attended Stanford University, where she won eight individual NCAA titles competing for the Stanford Cardinal swimming and diving team.  She was later named to the Stanford Athletic Hall of Fame.  Linzmeier missed qualifying for the 1984 U.S. Olympics team by three one-hundredths (0.03) of a second.

After swimming
Linzmeier Dorst is a real estate broker in the San Francisco Bay Area.  She and her husband, Christopher Dorst, a silver medalist as a member of the 1984 U.S. Olympic water polo team, have three daughters.

See also
 List of Stanford University people

References

1963 births
Living people
American female freestyle swimmers
Sportspeople from Mission Viejo, California
Stanford Cardinal women's swimmers
Swimmers at the 1983 Pan American Games
Pan American Games silver medalists for the United States
Pan American Games medalists in swimming
Universiade medalists in swimming
Universiade silver medalists for the United States
Medalists at the 1983 Summer Universiade
Medalists at the 1983 Pan American Games